Hemerobiinae is a subfamily of brown lacewings in the family Hemerobiidae. There are about 5 genera and at least 60 described species in Hemerobiinae.

Genera
These five genera belong to the subfamily Hemerobiinae:
 Hemerobiella Kimmins, 1940 i c g
 Hemerobius Linnaeus, 1758 i c g b
 Nesobiella Kimmins, 1935 i c g
 Nusalala Navás, 1913 i c g
 Wesmaelius Krueger, 1922 i c g b
Data sources: i = ITIS, c = Catalogue of Life, g = GBIF, b = Bugguide.net

References

Further reading

External links

 

Hemerobiiformia